is a railway station in the town of Sumita, Kesen District, Iwate Prefecture, Japan, operated by East Japan Railway Company (JR East).

Lines
Kamiarisu Station is served by the Kamaishi Line, and is located 65.4 rail kilometers from the terminus of the line at Hanamaki Station.

Station layout
The station has one side platform serving a single ground-level bi-directional track. There is no longer a station building, but only a small shelter on the platform. The station is unattended.

History
Kamiarisu Station opened on 10 October 1950. The station was absorbed into the JR East network upon the privatization of the Japanese National Railways (JNR) on 1 April 1987.

Surrounding area
The station is located in an isolated rural area.
 
Rokando Cave

See also
 List of railway stations in Japan

References

External links

  

Railway stations in Iwate Prefecture
Kamaishi Line
Railway stations in Japan opened in 1950
Sumita, Iwate
Stations of East Japan Railway Company